Croy railway station serves the village of Croy – as well as the nearby town of Kilsyth and parts of  Cumbernauld – in North Lanarkshire, Scotland. It is served by services on the Glasgow–Edinburgh mainline and services between Glasgow Queen Street and Stirling. Train services are provided by ScotRail.

Facilities

The station has park-and-ride facilities, with spaces for over 900 vehicles, including charging points for electrical vehicles. There are bus connections to Kilsyth and Cumbernauld.  The lines through the station have been electrified as part of the Edinburgh to Glasgow Improvement Programme.  Platform lengthening work has been carried out as part of this scheme. The station has cycle parking.

In November 2021, work began to install an accessible footbridge enabling step-free access to both platforms. This was completed and opened to the public in October 2022.

Services

2011
Monday to Saturdays, there is a half-hourly service southbound to Glasgow Queen Street and northbound to Edinburgh. The service is hourly in each direction on evenings and Sundays.

There is also a half-hourly service to Stirling Monday to Saturday, which continues alternately to Alloa or Dunblane. This provides a second half-hourly service to Glasgow calling at both Lenzie and Bishopbriggs, giving a combined four trains an hour to Glasgow off peak. On Sundays, an hourly service operates between Glasgow and Alloa.

2016

Half-hourly to Queen Street (express) and Edinburgh on the E&G main line in the daytime, and hourly in the evenings and on Sundays.  Half-hourly (local) service each way on the Croy Line to Queen Street and to Stirling, then alternating to either Dunblane or Alloa.  Hourly to Queen Street and Alloa on Sundays.

Electrification 
As part of the Edinburgh to Glasgow Improvement Programme, the line through the station has been electrified.

References

Sources

 
 

Railway stations in North Lanarkshire
SPT railway stations
Railway stations served by ScotRail
Railway stations in Great Britain opened in 1842
Former North British Railway stations
1842 establishments in Scotland
IDP Architects railway stations